Syneora excursaria is a moth of the family Geometridae first described by Francis Walker in 1863. It is known from Australia.

References

Boarmiini